On July 31, 1984, a series of gas explosions occurred in Waynesboro, Virginia, following reports of gas leaks earlier that night. Eleven people were killed and twenty-three others were injured.

Event

Explosion 
Eyewitnesses reported a smell of gas and white smoke coming out of manholes near the 5th Street and North Charlotte Avenue intersection in Waynesboro, Virginia, on July 31, 1984, at 8:46 p.m., over three hours prior to the incident. The explosion occurred later at 11:57 p.m. at 215 5th Street.

A portion of 5th Street was dug up Tuesday morning after a gas leak had been discovered during a fire call early Sunday morning.
Garbage cans caught fire outside 567 North Charlotte Avenue this past weekend. Though it only took fire crews about 10 minutes to put out the fire which broke out around 1:37 a.m., the odor of gas was the greater concern.

“Everyone smelled the gas,” said Waynesboro Deputy Fire Chief Jody Sanders.
It was later discovered that there was a gas leak into the basement section of a business located at 215 5th Street.
“We could have had at least five houses blow up. If the wind wasn't on our side then Augusta Lumber would have went up and it would have been much worse.”

Rescue efforts 
By the following morning, most of the fires had been fully extinguished or had burnt out by themselves, but a few remained. Paramedics, search and rescue dogs and helicopters swept the area looking for survivors. Heavy construction equipment was brought to the blast site to begin removing debris from the street. Schools and offices were closed on that day and residents were asked to leave their houses to smooth out the search and rescue operations. By afternoon, hundreds of people who fled the explosion scenes had returned home after houses around the explosion areas had been declared safe by the city spokesman. They confirmed that no more explosions could happen and that all of the fires had been put out. Traffic restrictions were put in place on multiple roads surrounding the explosion.

Immediate aftermath 
The remaining 260 tons of propane inside the damaged pipes was vented out completely by Monday from both of their input and output points. Nitrogen gas was put into pipes ensuring all propane had been removed, a move which had been done earlier by the Environmental Protection Agency.

References

Gas explosions in the United States
Waynesboro, Virginia